Bill Brand is a British television drama series produced by Thames Television for the ITV network which was shown in the summer of 1976.

Written by Trevor Griffiths, the series charts the political progress of the eponymous Brand, who becomes a Labour Party member of parliament for a Lancashire constituency after retaining the seat at a by-election with a small majority. A former Liberal Studies lecturer at a local Technical college, Brand finds the demands of his career at odds with his left-wing convictions.

Produced as one series of eleven episodes, Bill Brand stars Jack Shepherd in the title role. Arthur Lowe appeared as the Prime Minister, Arthur Watson (a character loosely based on Harold Wilson). Alan Badel played a left-wing Cabinet minister, David Last (a character based on Michael Foot), connected with The Journal, a thinly disguised Tribune newspaper. The decline of the textile industry, a major employer in Brand's constituency, is a secondary theme of the series. Geoffrey Palmer and Nigel Hawthorne were cast as moderate Trade ministers; the latter meets a delegation including Brand because his superior is engaged at a "City junket". Cherie Lunghi played Alex, a young woman with whom Brand has been having an extra-marital affair. The main cast also included Lynn Farleigh, as Brand's estranged wife, Rosemary Martin, as an MP who shares the same London house with Brand and other Labour MPs, and Colin Jeavons as a local constituency activist.

Cast

Jack Shepherd as Bill Brand
Lynn Farleigh as Miriam Brand
Rosemary Martin as Winnie Scoular
Cherie Lunghi as Alex Ferguson
Allan Surtees as Alf Jowett
Clifford Kershaw as Frank Hilton
Alan Badel as David Last
Colin Jeavons as Bernard Shaw
Arthur Lowe as Arthur Watson
Geoffrey Palmer as Malcolm Frear
Nigel Hawthorne as Browning

DVD release
The series was released on DVD in the UK in 2011.

References

External links
 
British Film Institute Screen Online

1976 British television series debuts
1976 British television series endings
1970s British drama television series
ITV television dramas
Television shows produced by Thames Television
English-language television shows
British political drama television series